Stumptown is an American comic book limited series and later ongoing, written by Greg Rucka with art by Matthew Southworth. The first series launched by Oni Press on November 4, 2009 and ran for four issues. A second miniseries began in September 2012 and ran for five issues and a third volume, this time ongoing, began in September 2014.

The comic book is a modern-day detective fiction series based in Portland, Oregon, featuring Dex Parios, a bisexual female private investigator with a gambling problem.

Plot
The first series begins in medias res with Dex's attempted murder and then showing the events leading up to this as she attempts to track down the granddaughter of a casino owner, who has promised to forgive Dex's heavy debt to the casino from her gambling losses in exchange for the girl's safe return.

Influences
In an iFanboy podcast, Rucka says he was going to write his college thesis on the American Detective genre. He cites authors such as Dennis Lehane, Robert B. Parker, and Raymond Chandler as influences in the creation of his character, Dex Parios.  He also credits television shows of his youth such as Magnum, P.I., Simon and Simon, and The Rockford Files.

Reception
Oni Press announced that in less than one week, the first issue sold out at the distributor level. The first volume was nominated for the 2011 Eisner Award for Best Limited Series.

Collected editions

Adaptation

On January 29, 2019, it was announced that ABC had ordered a pilot based on the graphic novels. A month later on February 25, Cobie Smulders was cast in the lead role as Dex Parios. The series premiered on September 25, 2019. It was originally renewed by ABC for a second season, but after delays due to the COVID-19 pandemic ended up delaying the beginning of production into 2021, the network reversed their decision and cancelled the series.

Notes

References

External links
Official series website

Portland, Oregon in fiction
Comics by Greg Rucka
Comics adapted into television series
Detective comics
LGBT-related comics